The Mbhashe Municipality is a rural outpost of the Eastern Cape of South Africa.

The Mbhashe Municipality was constituted in terms of the Municipal Structures Act. No. 117 of 1998 (as amended) and comprises the areas that previously formed the Elliotdale, Willowvale and Dutywa TLCs and TRCs. The Municipality is located in the North Eastern part of the Amathole District Municipality's area of jurisdiction. The main administrative office of the Municipality is situated in Dutywa.

Its primary claim to fame is as the birthplace of the former president Thabo Mbeki. The Mbanyana Falls, Mbhashe Cultural Village and Donald Wood's Snooker Room number among its attractions.

The name Mbashe is derived from Xhosa. The municipality is named after the Mbashe river that cuts through the three areas, namely Xhora (Elliotdale), Gatyana (Willowvale) and Dutywa. The area also boasts the head offices of the AmaXhosa Kingdom at Nqadu Great Place.

Main places
The 2001 census divided the municipality into the following main places:

Politics 

The municipal council consists of sixty-three members elected by mixed-member proportional representation. Thirty-two councillors are elected by first-past-the-post voting in thirty-two wards, while the remaining thirty-one are chosen from party lists so that the total number of party representatives is proportional to the number of votes received. In the election of 1 November 2021 the African National Congress (ANC) won a majority of forty-five seats on the council.
The following table shows the results of the election.

References

External links
 

Local municipalities of the Amatole District Municipality